Giro was a terrier dog (or German shepherd) that belonged to the German ambassador to the United Kingdom, Leopold von Hoesch. Giro died in 1934 after chewing through some electrical cable and was buried in the garden of the German embassy at 9 Carlton House Terrace.

Giro's tombstone was moved in the late 1960s to its present location following building work. It has been described as Britain's only Nazi memorial. Flowers are put on Giro's tombstone every February.

Gravestone text
"Giro"

Ein Treuer Begleiter

London Im Februar 1934

Hoesch.

EN: "Giro"

A faithful companion!

London in February 1934.

Hoesch.

References

1934 animal deaths
German expatriates in England
Individual dogs
St James's